Kuchh Love Kuchh Masti is Indian television series aired on Sahara One channel. The story is about three young women living together share one problem-topsy-turvy love lives.

Overview
The story portrays the lives of 3 women: Vartika, Neena and Pooja. They all have their own  problems, Vartika is infatuated with a married man, Neena's involved with an older guy, and Puja can't choose between two guys.

Cast
Madhuri Bhattacharya as Pooja 
Sonika Anand as Vartika
Sunaina Gulia as Neena

References

Sahara One original programming
Indian television series
2004 Indian television series debuts
2005 Indian television series endings